This Sceptred Isle may refer to:

 This Sceptred Isle (radio series), a BBC radio series
 This England (TV series), a British television docudrama miniseries

See also 
 Richard II (play), for the phrase describing England